National Tertiary Route 336, or just Route 336 (or ) is a National Road Route of Costa Rica, located in the San José province.

Description
In San José province the route covers Aserrí canton (Monterrey district), León Cortés Castro canton (San Andrés, San Antonio districts).

References

Highways in Costa Rica